Dolgellau Athletic A.F.C. are a Welsh football club based in Dolgellau, Wales. 
They have a reserve team playing in the Aberystwyth League Division One. In 2012 19-year-old David Webber became the youngest football manager in senior British football history when he was appointed first team manager at Dolgellau.

The home colours are yellow shirts with a black chevron and black shorts and socks.

A club was formed in Dolgellau as far back as 1878.

Cae Marian football ground gallery

Honours

Aberystwyth & District League Cup
1972–73, 1987–88
Aberystwyth & District League Division One
1980–81
Aberystwyth & District League Division Two
1987–88
J. Emrys Morgan Cup
2001/02
Aberystwyth League
2008–09

References 

Football clubs in Wales
1971 establishments in Wales
Association football clubs established in 1971
Sport in Gwynedd
Aberystwyth League clubs
Mid Wales Football League clubs